Ali Mardan may refer to:

 Ali Mardan, Iran (disambiguation), several places
 Ali Mardan Khalji (13th century),  ruler of Bengal in eastern India
 Ali Mardan Khan (died 1657), Kurdish military leader 
 Ali Mardan Khan Bakhtiari (r. 1750–1751), Bakhtiari chief of Iran
 Mir 'Ali Mardan Khan, Nuzrat ol-Molk (1840–1903), Persian noble
 Ali Merdan (1904–1981), Kurdish musician